Seqay (also Romanized as Seqāy and Saqāy; also known as Saghay, Sirgai, and Sygay) is a village in Jushin Rural District of Kharvana District, Varzaqan County, East Azerbaijan province, Iran. At the 2006 National Census, its population was 869 in 187 households. The following census in 2011 counted 775 people in 185 households. The latest census in 2016 showed a population of 722 people in 222 households; it was the largest village in its rural district.

References 

Varzaqan County

Populated places in East Azerbaijan Province

Populated places in Varzaqan County